Thamer Chaim (born 1 June 1945) is a Brazilian weightlifter. He competed in the men's super heavyweight event at the 1972 Summer Olympics.

References

1945 births
Living people
Brazilian male weightlifters
Olympic weightlifters of Brazil
Weightlifters at the 1972 Summer Olympics
Sportspeople from São Paulo
Pan American Games medalists in weightlifting
Pan American Games bronze medalists for Brazil
Weightlifters at the 1971 Pan American Games
20th-century Brazilian people